The year 1827 CE in archaeology included many events, some of which are listed below.

Excavations
May 17 - St Cuthbert's coffin at Durham Cathedral opened by James Raine.
Yorkshire Philosophical Society begins excavation of St Mary's Abbey, York, prior to construction of the Yorkshire Museum on part of the site.
First recorded excavation of Snape Anglo-Saxon Cemetery in eastern England.
Caspar Reuvens, professor of archaeology at Leiden University, begins excavation of Forum Hadriani, an important Roman site in the Netherlands, which will last into the 1830s.

Publications

Finds

Awards

Miscellaneous

Births
April 14 - Augustus Henry Lane-Fox, English archaeologist (died 1900 as Augustus Pitt Rivers).

Deaths

References

Archaeology
Archaeology
Archaeology by year
Archaeology